is located in Fushimi-ku, Kyoto, Kyoto Prefecture, Japan. It is used for horse racing. It has a capacity of 120,000. It was built in 1999.

History

Kyoto Race Course opened on December 1, 1925.

In preparation for the track's 100th anniversary, Kyoto Race Course will be closed from November 2020 until the Spring of 2023 for grandstand renovations. Races normally run at Kyoto will be moved to either Hanshin Racecourse or Chukyo Racecourse during this time.

Physical attributes

Kyoto Race Course has two turf courses, a dirt course, and a jump course.

The turf's  measures 1894m and the  measures 1783m . A chute permits races to be run on either oval at distances between 1400m and 1800m. Races can be run on the "A Course" rail setting (on the hedge), the "B Course" setting (rail out 4 meters), the "C Course" setting (rail out 7 metres) or the "D Course" setting (rail out 10 meters).

The dirt course measures 1608 metres, with a 1400m chute.

Source:

Notable races

See also
Yodo Station - Keihan Electric Railway Keihan Main Line

References

Horse racing venues in Japan
Sports venues in Kyoto Prefecture
Buildings and structures in Kyoto
Sports venues completed in 1925
1925 establishments in Japan